Rathnavali Balika Vidyalaya (Sinhala: රත්නාවලී බාලිකා විද්‍යාලය), is a leading government Buddhist national school for girls in Gampaha, Sri Lanka. Students are admitted to grade six on the basis of results of The Scholarship Examination in Sri Lanka.

History
There was a significant Buddhist reawakening with the arrival of Colonel Henry Steel Olcott. Buddhist schools were established throughout the country to promote Buddhist education across with the prevailing missionary system. In 1881 there was a Buddhist reawakening as a result of the start of the newspapers Sarasavi Sandaresa in 1880 and The Buddhist in 1881. After that, the expansion of school education came under the Buddhist Theosophical Society. Karunarathna laid the foundation stone for the school on 26 July 1945. After completing the construction work of the buildings of Rathnavali Balika Vidyalaya, D. D. Karunaratne handed over the school to the Buddhist Theosophical Society. 

Rathnavali Balika Vidyalaya was opened on 17 December 1947 with 60 students, a staff consist of two teachers under the management of Mrs. Denagama who was the first principal of Rathnavali Balika Vidyalaya. On the same day, both primary and secondary education were started as the constructions of the two buildings were completed.

Houses
There are 4 houses in Rathnavali Balika Vidyalaya which resemble 4 main ancient reputable feminine characters in Sri Lankan history.  
 Gothami - 
 Mahamaya - 
 Sangamiththa - 
 Vishaka -

Notable alumni

References

1947 establishments in Ceylon
Buddhist schools in Sri Lanka
Educational institutions established in 1947
Girls' schools in Sri Lanka
National schools in Sri Lanka
Schools in Gampaha